Amnon Rubinstein (born 5 September 1931) is an Israeli legal scholar, politician, and columnist. A member of the Knesset between 1977 and 2002, he served in several ministerial positions. He is currently dean of the Interdisciplinary Center (IDC) in Herzliya and a patron of Liberal International.

Early life
Rubinstein was born in Tel Aviv during the Mandate era. His family belonged to the Revisionist Zionist movement. Rubinstein would later split from Revisionism but remain impacted by the classical liberalism that influenced Revisionist founder Ze'ev Jabotinsky.

After serving as a captain in the IDF, he studied economics, international relations, and law at the Hebrew University of Jerusalem and was called to the bar in 1963. He received a PhD in law from the London School of Economics in 1966. Between 1961 and 1975 he worked as a professor of law at Tel Aviv University, serving as faculty dean from 1968 until 1973.

Political career
Rubinstein's political career began when he founded Shinui after the Yom Kippur War. Shinui joined Yigael Yadin's Democratic Movement to form Dash. In the 1977 elections, Dash won 15 seats in the Knesset. Dash's victory came at the expense of the Alignment; for the first time in the 29 years since the founding of the modern state of Israel, the right wing formed the government. However, Rubinstein opposed Dash's participation in Menachem Begin's Likud government coalition, and Shinui broke away from Dash. Rubinstein retained his seat in the 1981 elections, though Shinui was reduced to two seats. After winning three seats in the 1984 elections Shinui were invited into the governing coalition, and Rubinstein was appointed Minister of Communications. Rubinstein was re-elected again in 1988, but Shinui were left out of the government.

Prior to the 1992 elections Shinui merged with Shulamit Aloni's Ratz and Zionist-socialist Mapam to form Meretz, a dovish, social-democratic liberal party. Meretz joined Yitzhak Rabin's government in 1992, and Rubinstein was chosen as Minister of Energy and Infrastructure. However, early into his term he became Minister of Education instead, replacing Shulamit Aloni. As a legislator Rubinstein initiated and legislated the two basic laws that guarantee human rights in Israel (Basic Law: Human Dignity and Liberty, Basic Law: Freedom of Occupation).

As an Education Minister, Rubinstein lowered the bar for high school graduates to enter higher education and developed a system whereby high school students would be required to take fewer matriculation exams: the subjects for the exams would be chosen each year by lottery. He also spoke out against the standardized tests which are required of Israeli university applicants (roughly equivalent to the SAT exams), claiming that if he had been required to pass these exams, he would not have been accepted to Law school.

Following Likud's victory in the 1996 elections, Rubinstein and Meretz left the government. He was re-elected for a final time in 1999, and resigned from the Knesset at the end of October 2002.

Rubinstein lived to hear his own obituary read in 2000, when due to a practical joke, Knesset speaker Avraham Burg was led to believe that he had died. Rubinstein, who was hospitalized at the time for a minor complaint, saw his eulogy broadcast on television.

Academics and journalism
After retiring from politics Rubinstein returned to academia. He regularly writes opinion pieces for Israeli newspapers.

Rubinstein's scholarship is highly respected. His articles and books in the sphere of law in general, and especially Israeli law, have enjoyed wide acclaim. His collection A Single Voice (2002) outlined his "moderate, humanistic liberalism", according to a review in Haaretz.

Awards
In 2006, Rubinstein won the Israel Prize, for law. The Israel Prize award committee provided the following endorsement for its decision:

Amnon Rubinstein is "the founding father of Israeli constitutional law. In both his profound academic writings and his diverse public activities, he advances the values of democracy, equality and human rights. In the legal and public arena in Israel, there are few who can equal Prof. Amnon Rubinstein’s contribution to the State of Israel, as a public figure, a member of the legislative and executive branches of government, and as a brilliant researcher and legal expert."

Published works
Israel and the Family of Nations: The Jewish Nation State and Human Rights, 2008
The Constitutional Law of the State of Israel
Upholding morality
From Herzl to Rabin: The Changing Image of Zionism
Daat Yachid'Jurisdiction and Illegality: A Study in Public LawAbsence of Government: How to Mend Israel's Broken SystemAcademic Flaws – Freedom and Responsibility in Israeli Higher EducationThe BlanketRoute no. 5The Sea Above UsThe Black Sun : Kotarim International Publishing''
"The Curious Case of Jewish Democracy", Azure: Ideas for the Jewish Nation 41 (Summer 2010)

See also
List of Israel Prize recipients

References

External links
Official website

The right to democracy, Fathom: For a deeper understanding of Israel and the region, 30 January 2013
Interview on Social justice, academica and political changes, June 26, 2014
Amnon Rubinstein at Jewish Virtual Library

1931 births
Scholars of constitutional law
Living people
Israeli educators
Israeli Jews
Israeli legal scholars
Israel Prize in law recipients
Alumni of the London School of Economics
People from Tel Aviv
Scholars of antisemitism
Academic staff of Tel Aviv University
Academic staff of Reichman University
Shinui leaders
Democratic Movement for Change politicians
Meretz politicians
Ministers of Education of Israel
Ministers of Science of Israel
Members of the 9th Knesset (1977–1981)
Members of the 10th Knesset (1981–1984)
Members of the 11th Knesset (1984–1988)
Members of the 12th Knesset (1988–1992)
Members of the 13th Knesset (1992–1996)
Members of the 14th Knesset (1996–1999)
Members of the 15th Knesset (1999–2003)
Ministers of Communications of Israel
Deans of law schools in Israel